9th OTO Awards

SND, Bratislava, Slovakia

Overall winner  Mário Kollár

Hall of Fame  Emília Vášáryová

Život Award  Mesto tieňov 

KRAS Award   Vilomeniny 

◄ 8th | 10th ►

The 9th OTO Awards, honoring the best in Slovak popular culture for the year 2008, took time and place on March 11, 2009, at the former Opera building of the Slovak National Theater in Bratislava. The ceremony broadcast live STV. The host of the show was Jožef Pročko, featuring guest appearances by Michal Hudák and Juraj Mokrý.

Presenters

 Adela Banášová and Daniel Krajcer 
 Peter Batthyany and Monika Hilmerová
 Ladislav Chudík and Štefan Nižňanský
 Csongor Kassai, Ľuboš Kostelný and Lukáš Latinák
 Boris Kollár and Jana Prágerová
 Maroš Kramár and Janko Kroner
 Petra Polnišová
 Juraj Vaculík

Performers
 Michal Hudák and Juraj Mokrý
 IMT Smile, band
 Zuzana Mauréry, Nikol McCloud and Marcel Palonder, singers
 Tina, singer

Winners and nominees

Main categories
 Television

 Music

Others

In addition, the winning actress Diana Mórová has been voted by public as the best-dressed woman of the ceremony in an online-based poll run by Topky.sk, accumulating 43%. The actress wore a champagne-golden colored gown by a local fashion designer, Andrea Paldan, including a set of jewels made of diamonds and golden topazes by Elen Russo. The runner-up Adela Banášová, she scored 26%, while Lenka Hriadelová received 17% of the total votes.

Superlatives

Multiple nominees
 2 nominations
 Zlatica Švajdová (née Puškárová)

Reception

TV ratings
The broadcast of the awards gained Jednotka a 42.3% 12+ ratings share and was watched by 731,000 viewers, marking the second highest numbers for the show in the history and the most watched television program during prime time. Compared to its predecessor, the 9th OTO attracted 20,000 viewers more than in 2008. According to the STV network, the real-time event was the leader in all target groups that night, sharing audiences only with a TV JOJ series, Panelák.

The fine for Banášová
Almost two years later, the local Council for Broadcast and Retransmission (Rada pre vysielanie a retransmisiu) in Slovakia imposed on December 20, 2011, a fine of €3,000 to RTVS for "a prohibited direct support of sale, purchase and rental of goods, or services of the sponsor in the sponsored program OTO 2008", or rather for the Adela Banášová's acceptance speech during the event. She then said:
Well, I want to thank viewers of TV Markíza and [I] want to thank viewers of all televisions for [that], by means of their viewership, they create a pleasant competitive environment. I want to thank, I've spoken of TV Markíza twice to be sure, and [I] definitely believe [that] I am standing here also because I'm Fun Rádio, and so also this way.

References

External links
 Archive > OTO 2008 – 9th edition  (Official website)
 OTO 2008 – 9th edition (Official website - old)
 Winners and nominees - Top 3 list (at Trend)
 Nominations (the first round) - Top 7 list (at Trend)
 Nominations (the first round) - Top 7 list (at Movie Mania)

09
2008 in Slovak music
2008 in Slovak television
2008 television awards